This is a list of notable professional bodybuilding competitions.

A
 AAU Mr. America
 Armenian Bodybuilding Championships
 Arnold Classic
 Arnold Sports Festival

B
 Black Sea Cup
 British Grand Prix

C
 Canada Pro Cup
 Colorado Pro Championships

D
 Dubai Pro

E
 EVLS Prague Pro
 Europa Supershow

F
 Flex Pro
 FIBO Pro

G
 Grand Prix Hungary
 Grand Prix Australia
 Grand Prix Austria
 Grand Prix Holland
 Grand Prix Russia

I
 IFBB Mr. America
 IFBB
 IFBB Night of Champions
 IFBB Elite Pro
 IFBB Australian Pro Grand Prix
 IFBB Ferrigno Legacy
 INBF
 INBF Polynesian Natural Muscle Mayhem – HI
 INBF Diamond Figure & Bikini Championships – OK
 INBF South Carolina Natural – SC
 INBF Wisconsin Natural – WI
 INBF SpringMania – MA
 INBF Northeast Classic – WNBF Pro American INBF Northeast Classic – MA
 INBF Mr. and Mrs. Natural – CT
 INBF South Shore Natural – MA
 INBF Tulsa Natural – OK
 INBF Hercules WNBF Pro Masters – NY
 INBF Empire State Cup – NY
 INBF So Cal Uproar – CA
 INBF Cecil Phillips Classic – OR
 INBF Augusta Grand Prix – GA
 INBF WNBF Natural Autumn Explosion + US Pro Cup – CT
 INBF South Central USA – TX
 INBF WNBF Phoenician Classic Pro/Am – AZ
 INBF Washington State Olympic Championships – WA
 INBF Northwest Royal Natural Championships – WA
 INBF All American Championships – NY
 INBF Naturalmania WNBF Pro Universe – NY
 INBF Carolina Natural PC – NC
 INBF Battle for Broadway – NJ
 INBF Battle of the Bay – CA
 WNBF INBF Washington State Natural Puget Sound – WA
 INBF Southern Natural – GA
 INBF Florida Grand Prix – FL
 INBF Granite State Open – NH
 INBF Central USA – OK
 INBF WNBF Monster Mash Pro/Am – MA
 INBF WNBF World Championships – Las Vegas
 Ironman Pro Invitational

J
 Jay Cutler Desert Classic

L
 The LA Natural – Los Angeles – CA

M
 Mr. World
 Mr. Amateur
Beijing
 Spain
 Brazil
 Korea
 UK
 Shanghai
 India
 Japan
 Portugal
 USA
 South America
 Egypt
 Tunisia
 Mr. America
 Mr. Australia
 Mr. Olympia
 Ms. International
 Ms. Olympia

N
 NABBA Universe
 New York Pro
 New Zealand Grand Prix
 NPC USA Championships
 NPC Steve Stone Metropolitan Championships
 Natural Central Valley Championships (INBF)

P
 Prague Pro

R
 Rising Phoenix World Championships

S
 Show of Strength Pro Championship
 San Francisco Pro Invitational
 Sheru Classic

T
 Tampa Pro
 Toronto Pro Invitational
 Tijuana Pro

W
 WNBF
 WNBF Pro Figure INBF Tri State Natural – OH
 WNBF INBF Natural Muscle Mayhem Pro/Am – CA

See also

List of strongman competitions

References

 

bodybuilding
Incomplete sports lists
Incomplete sports result lists